Bez Ljubavi is the second studio album from Serbian pop singer Marija Šerifović. The album was recorded in 2005 but released in 2006.

Track listing
"Povredi me"
"Jesen bez nas"
"101"
"Na tvojoj košulji"
"Pamti me po suzama"
"Laž"
"Nije mi prvi put"
"Bilo bi ti bolje"
"Bez ljubavi"
"Trubači"
"U nedelju" (winning song of Serbian Radio Festival 2005)
"Bol do ludila" (winning song of the Budva Festival 2004)
"Gorka čokolada" (performed at the Budvanski Festival 2003)

External links
 Marija Šerifović Official Page (Serbian and English)
 On: www.discogs.com

Marija Šerifović albums
2006 albums